The Society for the Promotion of Indian Classical Music And Culture Amongst Youth (SPIC MACAY) is a voluntary youth movement which promotes intangible aspects of Indian cultural heritage by promoting Indian classical music, classical dance, folk music, yoga, meditation, crafts and other aspects of Indian culture; it is a movement with chapters in over 300 towns all over the world. SPIC MACAY was established by Dr. Kiran Seth in 1977 at IIT Delhi.

History
Kiran Seth, a young graduate from IIT Kharagpur, was studying for his doctorate at the Columbia University, New York, when he chanced to attend a Dhrupad concert by Ustad Nasir Aminuddin Dagar and Ustad Zia Fariddudin Dagar at the Brooklyn Academy of Music, New York City.

On his return to India in 1976, he started teaching and doing research work at IIT Delhi, where he got together with students and started SPIC MACAY in 1977, and its first concert by Dagar Brothers was held at IIT Delhi on March 28, 1978.

Some of its major activities include: FEST series, VIRASAT series, National Conventions for students and teachers, National School Intensives, Music in the Park, the SPIC MACAY Scholarship Programme, heritage walks, talks by eminent thinkers, Yoga camps, screening of Classic Cinema etc.

References

External links
 

Cultural heritage of India
Cultural organisations based in India
Non-profit organisations based in India
Organizations established in 1977
Youth organisations based in India